The Bernard Dadié national grand prize for literature awards in Côte d'Ivoire since 2014, "the major writers who give meaning and energy to national letters". Created by the Ivorian Ministry of Culture and Francophonie, it is open only to individual works. It aims on the one hand to promote books and reading, and on the other hand, to encourage literary creation. This national grand prize with a trophy and a sum of one million CFA francs is awarded at the Salon international du livre d'Abidjan (SILA).

Organization
The organization of competitions and ceremonies related to this prize is entrusted to Akwaba Culture, an Ivorian association.

Evolution
Initially, National Grand Prix of Literature, it became Bernard Dadié national grand prize for literature to pay homage to the eponymous writer.

List of winners
 2014: Charles Nokan for Tel que je suis (As I am)
 2016: Véronique Tadjo for Nelson Mandela : non à l’apartheid (Nelson Mandela: no to apartheid)
 2017: Josué Guébo pour Aux chemins de Babo Naki (Babo Naki's Paths)

References

Awards established in 2014
African literary awards